Parotocinclus polyochrus is a fish in the family Loricariidae native to South America. It is found swimming in the upper Negro River basin.

References

Burgess, W.E., 1989. An atlas of freshwater and marine catfishes. A preliminary survey of the Siluriformes. T.F.H. Publications, Inc., Neptune City, New Jersey (USA). 784 p. 

Otothyrinae
Taxa named by Scott Allen Schaefer
Fish described in 1988